Dawa Gyeltshen (born 7 June 1986) is a Bhutanese international footballer, currently playing for Thimphu City F.C. He made his first appearance for the Bhutan national football team in 2009.

References

1986 births
Bhutanese footballers
Bhutan international footballers
Transport United F.C. players
Living people
Association football defenders